James Bundy (born May 8, 1959 in Boston, Massachusetts) is an American theatre director and teacher who has served in the dual roles of Dean of Yale School of Drama and Artistic Director of Yale Repertory Theatre since 2002.

Education 
Bundy attended Groton School and received his AB in English and American Literature from Harvard College in 1981. He studied acting at the London Academy of Music and Dramatic Art, 1981-1984, and received his MFA in directing from Yale School of Drama in 1995.

Career 
As an actor, Bundy made his theatrical debut playing Santa Claus in a school Christmas pageant in the first grade. He worked professionally as an actor from 1984–89, appearing in productions at Magic Theatre, Woodminster Summer Musicals, San Jose Repertory Theatre, Music Hall Theater in San Francisco, Berkeley Repertory Theatre, and Oregon Shakespeare Festival.

From 1989-91, he was the Managing Director of Cornerstone Theatre Company prior to enrolling in Yale School of Drama in 1992. He served as Associate Producing Director of The Acting Company in New York City from 1996–98 and Artistic Director of Great Lakes Theater Festival in Cleveland, Ohio, 1998-2002. His appointment as Dean/Artistic Director of Yale School of Drama/Yale Repertory Theatre in New Haven, Connecticut, began full-time in 2002 and he has been reappointed for three consecutive five-year terms in 2007, in 2011, and again in 2016, at which time Yale President Peter Salovey noted  that Bundy's leadership "has sustained the school’s record as the top drama program in the country and advanced Yale Rep as one of the premiere locations for the development of new plays…[and] increased philanthropic support for drama at Yale including the transformational gift that endowed the Binger Center for New Theatre.” 

His directing credits at Yale Rep include Assassins, book by John Weidman, music and lyrics by Stephen Sondheim, 2016; Happy Days by Samuel Beckett starring Dianne Wiest and Jarlath Conroy, a production which Bundy directed again at Theater for a New Audience Brooklyn, New York, in 2017; Arcadia by Tom Stoppard, 2014; Hamlet by William Shakespeare, starring Paul Giamatti, 2013; Edward Albee's A Delicate Balance, 2011; Arthur Miller's Death of a Salesman starring Charles S. Dutton, 2009; Oscar Wilde's A Woman of No Importance, 2008; Shakespeare's All's Well That Ends Well, co-directed by Mark Rucker, 2006; The Ladies of the Camellias by Lillian Groag, 2004, and The Psychic Lives of Savages by Amy Freed, 2003.

Teaching 
Bundy has taught text analysis classes in Shakespeare, Molière, and Wilde; and Chekhov and Ibsen, since 2004. He has also taught various summer classes for actors at British American Drama Academy since 2005.

Awards and honors 
Tony Award nomination, Yale Repertory Theatre: Best Play, Indecent, 2017
National Theater Conference Outstanding Theater Award, Yale Repertory Theatre, 2014
Tom Killen Award, Connecticut Critics Circle, 2007
Outstanding Production, Connecticut Critics Circle, Yale Repertory Theatre, 2003, 2004, 2005, 2010, 2011, 2013, 2014, 2016
John Houseman Award, The Acting Company, 2012
Leadership Cleveland, 2000
Crain's Cleveland, 40 Under 40, 1998
Class Marshal, Yale School of Drama, 1995
Best Ensemble (Ah, Wilderness!), Bay Area Critics Circle, 1988

Service 
Bundy served as a trustee of Groton School, 2003–15, and a trustee of Theatre Communications Group, 2007-13.

Personal 
Bundy was born in Boston in 1959, one of four children of McGeorge Bundy and Mary Bundy. He married singer Anne Tofflemire in 1988. They have two daughters.

References 

1959 births
Living people
Yale School of Drama alumni
Harvard College alumni
Groton School alumni
American theatre directors
American artistic directors
Alumni of the London Academy of Music and Dramatic Art
People from Boston
Yale School of Drama faculty